Sucrose, a disaccharide, is a sugar composed of glucose and fructose subunits. It is produced naturally in plants and is the main constituent of white sugar. It has the molecular formula .

For human consumption, sucrose is extracted and refined from either sugarcane or sugar beet. Sugar mills – typically located in tropical regions near where sugarcane is grown – crush the cane and produce raw sugar which is shipped to other factories for refining into pure sucrose. Sugar beet factories are located in temperate climates where the beet is grown, and process the beets directly into refined sugar. The sugar-refining process involves washing the raw sugar crystals before dissolving them into a sugar syrup which is filtered and then passed over carbon to remove any residual colour. The sugar syrup is then concentrated by boiling under a vacuum and crystallized as the final purification process to produce crystals of pure sucrose that are clear, odorless, and sweet.

Sugar is often an added ingredient in food production and recipes. About 185 million tonnes of sugar were produced worldwide in 2017.

Sucrose is particularly dangerous as a risk factor for tooth decay because Streptococcus mutans bacteria convert it into a sticky, extracellular, dextran-based polysaccharide that allows them to cohere, forming plaque. Sucrose is the only sugar that bacteria can use to form this sticky polysaccharide.

Etymology
The word sucrose was coined in 1857, by the English chemist William Miller from the French  ("sugar") and the generic chemical suffix for sugars -ose. The abbreviated term Suc is often used for sucrose in scientific literature.

The name saccharose was coined in 1860 by the French chemist Marcellin Berthelot. Saccharose is an obsolete name for sugars in general, especially sucrose.

Physical and chemical properties

Structural O-α-D-glucopyranosyl-(1→2)-β-D-fructofuranoside
In sucrose, the monomers glucose and fructose are linked via an ether bond between C1 on the glucosyl subunit and C2 on the fructosyl unit. The bond is called a glycosidic linkage. Glucose exists predominantly as a mixture of α and β "pyranose" anomers, but sucrose has only the α form. Fructose exists as a mixture of five tautomers but sucrose has only the β-D-fructofuranose form. Unlike most disaccharides, the glycosidic bond in sucrose is formed between the reducing ends of both glucose and fructose, and not between the reducing end of one and the non-reducing end of the other. This linkage inhibits further bonding to other saccharide units, and prevents sucrose from spontaneously reacting with cellular and circulatory macromolecules in the manner that glucose and other reducing sugars do. Since sucrose contains no anomeric hydroxyl groups, it is classified as a non-reducing sugar.

Sucrose crystallizes in the monoclinic space group P21 with room-temperature lattice parameters a = 1.08631 nm, b = 0.87044 nm, c = 0.77624 nm, β = 102.938°.

The purity of sucrose is measured by polarimetry, through the rotation of plane-polarized light by a sugar solution. The specific rotation at  using yellow "sodium-D" light (589 nm) is +66.47°. Commercial samples of sugar are assayed using this parameter. Sucrose does not deteriorate at ambient conditions.

Thermal and oxidative degradation

Sucrose does not melt at high temperatures. Like other carbohydrates, it combusts to carbon dioxide and water. Mixing sucrose with the oxidizer potassium nitrate produces the fuel known as rocket candy that is used to propel amateur rocket motors.

This reaction is somewhat simplified though. Some of the carbon does get fully oxidized to carbon dioxide, and other reactions, such as the water-gas shift reaction also take place. A more accurate theoretical equation is:

Sucrose burns with chloric acid, formed by the reaction of hydrochloric acid and potassium chlorate:

Sucrose can be dehydrated with sulfuric acid to form a black, carbon-rich solid, as indicated in the following idealized equation:

Hydrolysis
Hydrolysis breaks the glycosidic bond converting sucrose into glucose and fructose. Hydrolysis is, however, so slow that solutions of sucrose can sit for years with negligible change. If the enzyme sucrase is added, however, the reaction will proceed rapidly. Hydrolysis can also be accelerated with acids, such as cream of tartar or lemon juice, both weak acids. Likewise, gastric acidity converts sucrose to glucose and fructose during digestion, the bond between them being an acetal bond which can be broken by an acid.

Synthesis and biosynthesis of sucrose
The biosynthesis of sucrose proceeds via the precursors UDP-glucose and fructose 6-phosphate, catalyzed by the enzyme sucrose-6-phosphate synthase. The energy for the reaction is gained by the cleavage of uridine diphosphate (UDP).
Sucrose is formed by plants, algae and cyanobacteria but not by other organisms. Sucrose is the end product of photosynthesis and is found naturally in many food plants along with the monosaccharide fructose. In many fruits, such as pineapple and apricot, sucrose is the main sugar. In others, such as grapes and pears, fructose is the main sugar.

Chemical synthesis
After numerous unsuccessful attempts by others, Raymond Lemieux and George Huber succeeded in synthesizing sucrose from acetylated glucose and fructose in 1953.

Sources 
In nature, sucrose is present in many plants, and in particular their roots, fruits and nectars, because it serves as a way to store energy, primarily from photosynthesis. Many mammals, birds, insects and bacteria accumulate and feed on the sucrose in plants and for some it is their main food source. Although honeybees consume sucrose, the honey they produce consists primarily of fructose and glucose, with only trace amounts of sucrose.

As fruits ripen, their sucrose content usually rises sharply, but some fruits contain almost no sucrose at all. This includes grapes, cherries, blueberries, blackberries, figs, pomegranates, tomatoes, avocados, lemons and limes.

Sucrose is a naturally occurring sugar, but with the advent of industrialization, it has been increasingly refined and consumed in all kinds of processed foods.

Production

History of sucrose refinement

The production of table sugar has a long history. Some scholars claim Indians discovered how to crystallize sugar during the Gupta dynasty, around AD 350.

Other scholars point to the ancient manuscripts of China, dated to the 8th century BC, where one of the earliest historical mentions of sugar cane is included along with the fact that their knowledge of sugar cane was derived from India. By about 500 BC, residents of modern-day India began making sugar syrup, cooling it in large flat bowls to produce raw sugar crystals that were easier to store and transport. In the local Indian language, these crystals were called , which is the source of the word candy.

The army of Alexander the Great was halted on the banks of river Indus by the refusal of his troops to go further east. On their return journey, the Greek soldiers carried back some of the "honey-bearing reeds". Sugarcane remained a limited crop for over a millennium. Sugar was a rare commodity and traders of sugar became wealthy. Venice, at the height of its financial power, was the chief sugar-distributing center of Europe. Arabs started producing it in Sicily and Spain. Only after the Crusades did it begin to rival honey as a sweetener in Europe. The Spanish began cultivating sugarcane in the West Indies in 1506 (Cuba in 1523). The Portuguese first cultivated sugarcane in Brazil in 1532.

Sugar remained a luxury in much of the world until the 18th century. Only the wealthy could afford it. In the 18th century, the demand for table sugar boomed in Europe and by the 19th century it had become regarded as a human necessity. The use of sugar grew from use in tea, to cakes, confectionery and chocolates. Suppliers marketed sugar in novel forms, such as solid cones, which required consumers to use a sugar nip, a pliers-like tool, in order to break off pieces.

The demand for cheaper table sugar drove, in part, colonization of tropical islands and nations where labor-intensive sugarcane plantations and table sugar manufacturing could thrive. Growing sugar cane crop in hot humid climates, and producing table sugar in high temperature sugar mills was harsh, inhumane work. The demand for cheap labor for this work, in part, first drove slave trade from Africa (in particular West Africa), followed by indentured labor trade from South Asia (in particular India). Millions of slaves, followed by millions of indentured laborers were brought into the Caribbean, Indian Ocean, Pacific Islands, East Africa, Natal, north and eastern parts of South America, and southeast Asia. The modern ethnic mix of many nations, settled in the last two centuries, has been influenced by table sugar.

Beginning in the late 18th century, the production of sugar became increasingly mechanized. The steam engine first powered a sugar mill in Jamaica in 1768, and, soon after, steam replaced direct firing as the source of process heat. During the same century, Europeans began experimenting with sugar production from other crops. Andreas Marggraf identified sucrose in beet root and his student Franz Achard built a sugar beet processing factory in Silesia (Prussia). The beet-sugar industry took off during the Napoleonic Wars, when France and the continent were cut off from Caribbean sugar. In 2009, about 20 percent of the world's sugar was produced from beets.

Today, a large beet refinery producing around 1,500 tonnes of sugar a day needs a permanent workforce of about 150 for 24-hour production.

Trends

Table sugar (sucrose) comes from plant sources. Two important sugar crops predominate: sugarcane (Saccharum spp.) and sugar beets (Beta vulgaris), in which sugar can account for 12% to 20% of the plant's dry weight. Minor commercial sugar crops include the date palm (Phoenix dactylifera), sorghum (Sorghum vulgare), and the sugar maple (Acer saccharum). Sucrose is obtained by extraction of these crops with hot water; concentration of the extract gives syrups, from which solid sucrose can be crystallized. In 2017, worldwide production of table sugar amounted to 185 million tonnes.

Most cane sugar comes from countries with warm climates, because sugarcane does not tolerate frost. Sugar beets, on the other hand, grow only in cooler temperate regions and do not tolerate extreme heat. About 80 percent of sucrose is derived from sugarcane, the rest almost all from sugar beets.

In mid-2018, India and Brazil had about the same production of sugar – 34 million tonnes – followed by the European Union, Thailand, and China as the major producers. India, the European Union, and China were the leading domestic consumers of sugar in 2018.

Beet sugar comes from regions with cooler climates: northwest and eastern Europe, northern Japan, plus some areas in the United States (including California). In the northern hemisphere, the beet-growing season ends with the start of harvesting around September. Harvesting and processing continues until March in some cases. The availability of processing plant capacity and the weather both influence the duration of harvesting and processing – the industry can store harvested beets until processed, but a frost-damaged beet becomes effectively unprocessable.

The United States sets high sugar prices to support its producers, with the effect that many former purchasers of sugar have switched to corn syrup (beverage manufacturers) or moved out of the country (candy manufacturers).

The low prices of glucose syrups produced from wheat and corn (maize) threaten the traditional sugar market. Used in combination with artificial sweeteners, they can allow drink manufacturers to produce very low-cost goods.

High-fructose corn syrup

High-fructose corn syrup (HFCS) is significantly cheaper as a sweetener for food and beverage manufacturing than refined sucrose. This has led to sucrose being partially displaced in U.S. industrial food production by HFCS and other non-sucrose natural sweeteners.

Reports in public media have regarded HFCS as less safe than sucrose. However, the most common forms of HFCS contain either 42 percent fructose, mainly used in processed foods, or 55 percent fructose, mainly used in soft drinks, as compared to sucrose, which is 50 percent fructose. Given approximately equal glucose and fructose content, there does not appear to be a significant difference in safety. Clinical dietitians, medical professionals, and the U.S. Food and Drug Administration (FDA) agree that dietary sugars are a source of empty calories associated with certain health problems, and recommend limiting the overall consumption of sugar-based sweeteners.

Types

Cane

Since the 6th century BC, cane sugar producers have crushed the harvested vegetable material from sugarcane in order to collect and filter the juice. They then treat the liquid, often with lime (calcium oxide), to remove impurities and then neutralize it. Boiling the juice then allows the sediment to settle to the bottom for dredging out, while the scum rises to the surface for skimming off. In cooling, the liquid crystallizes, usually in the process of stirring, to produce sugar crystals. Centrifuges usually remove the uncrystallized syrup. The producers can then either sell the sugar product for use as is, or process it further to produce lighter grades. The later processing may take place in another factory in another country.

Sugarcane is a major component of Brazilian agriculture; the country is the world's largest producer of sugarcane and its derivative products, such as crystallized sugar and ethanol (ethanol fuel).

Beet

Beet sugar producers slice the washed beets, then extract the sugar with hot water in a "diffuser". An alkaline solution ("milk of lime" and carbon dioxide from the lime kiln) then serves to precipitate impurities (see carbonatation). After filtration, evaporation concentrates the juice to a content of about 70% solids, and controlled crystallisation extracts the sugar. A centrifuge removes the sugar crystals from the liquid, which gets recycled in the crystalliser stages. When economic constraints prevent the removal of more sugar, the manufacturer discards the remaining liquid, now known as molasses, or sells it on to producers of animal feed.

Sieving the resultant white sugar produces different grades for selling.

Cane versus beet
It is difficult to distinguish between fully refined sugar produced from beet and cane. One way is by isotope analysis of carbon. Cane uses C4 carbon fixation, and beet uses C3 carbon fixation, resulting in a different ratio of 13C and 12C isotopes in the sucrose. Tests are used to detect fraudulent abuse of European Union subsidies or to aid in the detection of adulterated fruit juice.

Sugar cane tolerates hot climates better, but the production of sugar cane needs approximately four times as much water as the production of sugar beet. As a result, some countries that traditionally produced cane sugar (such as Egypt) have built new beet sugar factories since about 2008. Some sugar factories process both sugar cane and sugar beets and extend their processing period in that way.

The production of sugar leaves residues that differ substantially depending on the raw materials used and on the place of production. While cane molasses is often used in food preparation, humans find molasses from sugar beets unpalatable, and it consequently ends up mostly as industrial fermentation feedstock (for example in alcohol distilleries), or as animal feed. Once dried, either type of molasses can serve as fuel for burning.

Pure beet sugar is difficult to find, so labelled, in the marketplace. Although some makers label their product clearly as "pure cane sugar", beet sugar is almost always labeled simply as sugar or pure sugar. Interviews with the 5 major beet sugar-producing companies revealed that many store brands or "private label" sugar products are pure beet sugar. The lot code can be used to identify the company and the plant from which the sugar came, enabling beet sugar to be identified if the codes are known.

Culinary sugars

Mill white
Mill white, also called plantation white, crystal sugar or superior sugar is produced from raw sugar. It is exposed to sulfur dioxide during the production to reduce the concentration of color compounds and helps prevent further color development during the crystallization process. Although common to sugarcane-growing areas, this product does not store or ship well. After a few weeks, its impurities tend to promote discoloration and clumping; therefore this type of sugar is generally limited to local consumption.

Blanco directo
Blanco directo, a white sugar common in India and other south Asian countries, is produced by precipitating many impurities out of cane juice using phosphoric acid and calcium hydroxide, similar to the carbonatation technique used in beet sugar refining. Blanco directo is more pure than mill white sugar, but less pure than white refined.

White refined

White refined is the most common form of sugar in North America and Europe. Refined sugar is made by dissolving and purifying raw sugar using phosphoric acid similar to the method used for blanco directo, a carbonatation process involving calcium hydroxide and carbon dioxide, or by various filtration strategies. It is then further purified by filtration through a bed of activated carbon or bone char. Beet sugar refineries produce refined white sugar directly without an intermediate raw stage.

White refined sugar is typically sold as granulated sugar, which has been dried to prevent clumping and comes in various crystal sizes for home and industrial use:

 Coarse-grain, such as sanding sugar (also called "pearl sugar", "decorating sugar", nibbed sugar or sugar nibs) is a coarse grain sugar used to add sparkle and flavor atop baked goods and candies. Its large reflective crystals will not dissolve when subjected to heat.
 Granulated, familiar as table sugar, with a grain size about 0.5 mm across. "Sugar cubes" are lumps for convenient consumption produced by mixing granulated sugar with sugar syrup.
 Caster (0.35 mm), a very fine sugar in Britain and other Commonwealth countries, so-named because the grains are small enough to fit through a sugar caster which is a small vessel with a perforated top, from which to sprinkle sugar at table. Commonly used in baking and mixed drinks, it is sold as "superfine" sugar in the United States. Because of its fineness, it dissolves faster than regular white sugar and is especially useful in meringues and cold liquids. Caster sugar can be prepared at home by grinding granulated sugar for a couple of minutes in a mortar or food processor.
 Powdered, 10X sugar, confectioner's sugar (0.060 mm), or icing sugar (0.024 mm), produced by grinding sugar to a fine powder. The manufacturer may add a small amount of anticaking agent to prevent clumping — either corn starch (1% to 3%) or tri-calcium phosphate.

Brown sugar comes either from the late stages of cane sugar refining, when sugar forms fine crystals with significant molasses content, or from coating white refined sugar with a cane molasses syrup (blackstrap molasses). Brown sugar's color and taste becomes stronger with increasing molasses content, as do its moisture-retaining properties. Brown sugars also tend to harden if exposed to the atmosphere, although proper handling can reverse this.

Measurement

Dissolved sugar content
Scientists and the sugar industry use degrees Brix (symbol °Bx), introduced by Adolf Brix, as units of measurement of the mass ratio of dissolved substance to water in a liquid. A 25 °Bx sucrose solution has 25 grams of sucrose per 100 grams of liquid; or, to put it another way, 25 grams of sucrose sugar and 75 grams of water exist in the 100 grams of solution.

The Brix degrees are measured using an infrared sensor. This measurement does not equate to Brix degrees from a density or refractive index measurement, because it will specifically measure dissolved sugar concentration instead of all dissolved solids. When using a refractometer, one should report the result as "refractometric dried substance" (RDS). One might speak of a liquid as having 20 °Bx RDS. This refers to a measure of percent by weight of total dried solids and, although not technically the same as Brix degrees determined through an infrared method, renders an accurate measurement of sucrose content, since sucrose in fact forms the majority of dried solids. The advent of in-line infrared Brix measurement sensors has made measuring the amount of dissolved sugar in products economical using a direct measurement.

Consumption

Refined sugar was a luxury before the 18th century. It became widely popular in the 18th century, then graduated to becoming a necessary food in the 19th century. This evolution of taste and demand for sugar as an essential food ingredient unleashed major economic and social changes. Eventually, table sugar became sufficiently cheap and common enough to influence standard cuisine and flavored drinks.

Sucrose forms a major element in confectionery and desserts. Cooks use it for sweetening. It can also act as a food preservative when used in sufficient concentrations. Sucrose is important to the structure of many foods, including biscuits and cookies, cakes and pies, candy, and ice cream and sorbets. It is a common ingredient in many processed and so-called "junk foods".

Nutritional information

Fully refined sugar is 99.9% sucrose, thus providing only carbohydrate as dietary nutrient and 390 kilocalories per 100 g serving (USDA data, right table). There are no micronutrients of significance in fully refined sugar (right table).

Metabolism of sucrose

In humans and other mammals, sucrose is broken down into its constituent monosaccharides, glucose and fructose, by sucrase or isomaltase glycoside hydrolases, which are located in the membrane of the microvilli lining the duodenum. The resulting glucose and fructose molecules are then rapidly absorbed into the bloodstream. In bacteria and some animals, sucrose is digested by the enzyme invertase. Sucrose is an easily assimilated macronutrient that provides a quick source of energy, provoking a rapid rise in blood glucose upon ingestion. Sucrose, as a pure carbohydrate, has an energy content of 3.94 kilocalories per gram (or 17 kilojoules per gram).

If consumed excessively, sucrose may contribute to the development of metabolic syndrome, including increased risk for type 2 diabetes, insulin resistance, weight gain and obesity in adults and children.

Tooth decay 
Tooth decay (dental caries) has become a pronounced health hazard associated with the consumption of sugars, especially sucrose. Oral bacteria such as Streptococcus mutans live in dental plaque and metabolize any free sugars (not just sucrose, but also glucose, lactose, fructose, and cooked starches) into lactic acid. The resultant lactic acid lowers the pH of the tooth's surface, stripping it of minerals in the process known as tooth decay.

All 6-carbon sugars and disaccharides based on 6-carbon sugars can be converted by dental plaque bacteria into acid that demineralizes teeth, but sucrose may be uniquely useful to Streptococcus sanguinis (formerly Streptococcus sanguis) and Streptococcus mutans. Sucrose is the only dietary sugar that can be converted to sticky glucans (dextran-like polysaccharides) by extracellular enzymes. These glucans allow the bacteria to adhere to the tooth surface and to build up thick layers of plaque. The anaerobic conditions deep in the plaque encourage the formation of acids, which leads to carious lesions. Thus, sucrose could enable S. mutans, S. sanguinis and many other species of bacteria to adhere strongly and resist natural removal, e.g. by flow of saliva, although they are easily removed by brushing. The glucans and levans (fructose polysaccharides) produced by the plaque bacteria also act as a reserve food supply for the bacteria.
Such a special role of sucrose in the formation of tooth decay is much more significant in light of the almost universal use of sucrose as the most desirable sweetening agent. Widespread replacement of sucrose by high-fructose corn syrup (HFCS) has not diminished the danger from sucrose. If smaller amounts of sucrose are present in the diet, they will still be sufficient for the development of thick, anaerobic plaque and plaque bacteria will metabolise other sugars in the diet, such as the glucose and fructose in HFCS.

Glycemic index
Sucrose is a disaccharide made up of 50% glucose and 50% fructose and has a glycemic index of 65.  Sucrose is digested rapidly, but has a relatively low glycemic index due to its content of fructose, which has a minimal effect on blood glucose.

As with other sugars, sucrose is digested into its components via the enzyme sucrase to glucose (blood sugar). The glucose component is transported into the blood where it serves immediate metabolic demands, or is converted and reserved in the liver as glycogen.

Gout
The occurrence of gout is connected with an excess production of uric acid. A diet rich in sucrose may lead to gout as it raises the level of insulin, which prevents excretion of uric acid from the body. As the concentration of uric acid in the body increases, so does the concentration of uric acid in the joint liquid and beyond a critical concentration, the uric acid begins to precipitate into crystals. Researchers have implicated sugary drinks high in fructose in a surge in cases of gout.

Sucrose intolerance

UN dietary recommendation
In 2015, the World Health Organization published a new guideline on sugars intake for adults and children, as a result of an extensive review of the available scientific evidence by a multidisciplinary group of experts. The guideline recommends that both adults and children ensure their intake of free sugars (monosaccharides and disaccharides added to foods and beverages by the manufacturer, cook or consumer, and sugars naturally present in honey, syrups, fruit juices and fruit juice concentrates) is less than 10% of total energy intake. A level below 5% of total energy intake brings additional health benefits, especially with regards to dental caries.

Religious concerns
The sugar refining industry often uses bone char (calcinated animal bones) for decolorizing. About 25% of sugar produced in the U.S. is processed using bone char as a filter, the remainder being processed with activated carbon. As bone char does not seem to remain in finished sugar, Jewish religious leaders consider sugar filtered through it to be pareve, meaning that it is neither meat nor dairy and may be used with either type of food. However, the bone char must source to a kosher animal (e.g. cow, sheep) for the sugar to be kosher.

Trade and economics
One of the most widely traded commodities in the world throughout history, sugar accounts for around 2% of the global dry cargo market. International sugar prices show great volatility, ranging from around 3 cents to over 60 cents per pound in the  50 years. About 100 of the world's 180 countries produce sugar from beet or cane, a few more refine raw sugar to produce white sugar, and all countries consume sugar.

Many countries subsidize sugar production heavily. The European Union, the United States, Japan, and many developing countries subsidize domestic production and maintain high tariffs on imports.

Within international trade bodies, especially in the World Trade Organization (WTO), the "G20" countries led by Brazil have long argued that, because these sugar markets in essence exclude cane sugar imports, the G20 sugar producers receive lower prices than they would under free trade. While both the European Union and United States maintain trade agreements whereby certain developing and least developed countries (LDCs) can sell certain quantities of sugar into their markets, free of the usual import tariffs, countries outside these preferred trade régimes have complained that these arrangements violate the "most favoured nation" principle of international trade. This has led to numerous tariffs and levies in the past.

In 2004, the WTO sided with a group of cane sugar exporting nations (led by Brazil and Australia) and ruled illegal the EU sugar-régime and the accompanying ACP-EU Sugar Protocol, that granted a group of African, Caribbean, and Pacific countries receive preferential access to the European sugar market. In response to this and to other rulings of the WTO, and owing to internal pressures against the EU sugar-régime, the European Commission proposed on 22 June 2005 a radical reform of the EU sugar-régime that cut prices by 39% and eliminated all EU sugar exports.
The African, Caribbean, Pacific and LDC sugar exporters reacted with dismay to the EU sugar proposals. On 25 November 2005, the EC agreed to cut EU sugar prices by 36% as from 2009.

In 2007, it seemed that the U.S. Sugar Program could become the next target for reform. However, some commentators expected heavy lobbying from the U.S. sugar industry, which donated $2.7 million to U.S. House and Senate incumbents in the 2006 U.S. election, more than any other group of U.S. food-growers. Especially prominent among sugar lobbyists were the Fanjul Brothers, so-called "sugar barons" who made the single  individual contributions of soft money to both the Democratic and Republican parties in the U.S. political system.

Small quantities of sugar, especially specialty grades of sugar, reach the market as 'fair trade' commodities; the fair trade system produces and sells these products with the understanding that a larger-than-usual fraction of the revenue will support small farmers in the developing world. However, whilst the Fairtrade Foundation offers a premium of $60.00 per tonne to small farmers for sugar branded as "Fairtrade", government schemes such as the U.S. Sugar Program and the ACP-EU Sugar Protocol offer premiums of around $400.00 per tonne above world market prices. However, the EU announced on 14 September 2007 that it had offered "to eliminate all duties and quotas on the import of sugar into the EU".

The U.S. Sugar Association subsequently launched a campaign to promote sugar over artificial substitutes. The Association  aggressively contradicts many common beliefs regarding negative side-effects of sugar consumption. The campaign aired a high-profile television commercial during the 2007 Primetime Emmy Awards on FOX Television.

References

Further reading

External links

 3D images of sucrose
 CDC – NIOSH Pocket Guide to Chemical Hazards

Disaccharides
Sugars